Jason Luan  (born April 23, 1963) is a Canadian politician who was elected in the 2019 Alberta general election to represent the electoral district of Calgary-Foothills in the 30th Alberta Legislature. He was previously elected in the 2012 Alberta general election to represent the electoral district of Calgary-Hawkwood in the 28th Alberta Legislature. Luan served was an associate minister for mental health and then became the minister for community and social services on July 8, 2021 in the cabinet of Jason Kenney.  Under the premiership of Danielle Smith he became the minister of culture on October 24, 2022.

Electoral history

References

1963 births
Living people
Canadian social workers
Politicians from Calgary
Progressive Conservative Association of Alberta MLAs
University of Calgary alumni
21st-century Canadian politicians
Canadian politicians of Chinese descent
Members of the Executive Council of Alberta